María Paloma Rodríguez Vázquez (23 May 1956 – 15 March 2021) was a Spanish politician who served as a member of the Congress of Deputies between 2012 and 2015 for the Socialists' Party of Galicia.

References

1956 births
2021 deaths
Politicians from Galicia (Spain)
Spanish Socialist Workers' Party politicians
Women members of the Congress of Deputies (Spain)
Members of the 10th Congress of Deputies (Spain)
21st-century Spanish women politicians